Hedong Township is a township of Songxi County in northern Fujian province, China, located about  west of the border with Zhejiang and adjacent to and east of the county seat. The township's name refers to its location east of a river, the valley of which this settlement is located in. , it has one residential community and six villages under its administration.

See also 
 List of township-level divisions of Fujian

References 

Township-level divisions of Fujian
Songxi County